Sir John Barker, 1st Baronet (6 April 1840 – 16 December 1914) was a British entrepreneur of the late 19th and early 20th century. He was the founder of the Barkers department store in Kensington, London, United Kingdom.

Early life
John Barker was born on 6 April 1840 in Loose, Kent, England. He grew up in Maidstone, where his father, Joseph Barker, was a brewer. He was apprenticed as a draper in Maidstone for three years.

Career
Barker began his career by working as a draper in Folkestone and Dover. In 1858, he worked for Spencer, Turner & Boldero in Marylebone, London. He subsequently worked for William Whiteley on Westbourne Grove in Bayswater, London. After Whiteley refused to partner with Barker, the latter decided to open a store on Kensington High Street with Sir James Whitehead, 1st Baronet instead. As a result, the two men founded Barkers of Kensington. It became a public company known as John Barker & Co Ltd in 1894.

Barker was an Alderman of the first London County Council and Liberal MP for Maidstone 1900–1901, and for the now abolished constituency of Penryn and Falmouth in Cornwall from 1906 to 1910. He was awarded a baronetcy in 1908.

Personal life and death
Barker lived at The Grange, Rye Street, Bishop's Stortford. Its grounds included what is now Grange Park and Broadfield. His daughter Annie married Tresham Gilbey, one of the sons of Sir Walter Gilbey.

Barker died on 16 December 1914.

References

External links 
 
 The story of John Barker & Co Ltd, Kensington, London, from Michael Moss and Alison Turton, A Legend of Retailing: House of Fraser, Weidenfeld & Nicolson, 1989.

1840 births
1914 deaths
People from Maidstone
Baronets in the Baronetage of the United Kingdom
English businesspeople in retailing
Liberal Party (UK) MPs for English constituencies
UK MPs 1900–1906
UK MPs 1906–1910
Members of London County Council
Members of the Parliament of the United Kingdom for Penryn and Falmouth
Progressive Party (London) politicians
People from Loose, Kent
19th-century English businesspeople